Charles Edward Coates, Jr. (August 13, 1866 – December 27, 1939) was an American academic, chemist, and college football player and coach. He was the third faculty member with a PhD in Louisiana State University's history. Coates was known worldwide for his work in sugar chemistry research and he served as the dean of the Audubon Sugar School. Coates was also the first head coach of the LSU Tigers football team. He lost the only game he ever coached in 1893 to a team composed mostly of ex-Tulane players and members of the Southern Athletic Club, 34–0.

Coates was born in Baltimore, Maryland in 1866. His father, Charles E. Coates, Sr., practiced medicine in Baltimore after moving from Coatesville, Pennsylvania, which had been settled by and named for his ancestors. Coates played football at Johns Hopkins University and when he came to LSU in 1893, he volunteered to organize and coach the school's first football squad. He married Ollie Maurin of Donaldsonville, Louisiana in 1901. The couple had four children. Coates died in 1939.

The Charles E. Coates Memorial Fund at LSU is named after him, as is Coates Hall, a building on LSU's campus.

Head coaching record

References

External links
 

1866 births
1939 deaths
American chemists
Johns Hopkins Blue Jays football players
Louisiana State University faculty
LSU Tigers football coaches
Coaches of American football from Maryland
Players of American football from Baltimore